Constantiaberg is a large, whalebacked mountain that forms part of the mountainous spine of the Cape Peninsula in Table Mountain National Park, Cape Town, South Africa. It lies about 7 km south of Table Mountain, on the southern side of Constantia Nek. The mountain is 927 m high. It is not known who first ascended the peak.

Constantiaberg, Devil's Peak and Table Mountain are the highest mountains in the range that stretches from Table Mountain all the way to Cape Point. The range, made up of resistant sandstones of the Table Mountain Group, dominates the southern suburbs of the city on the verge of the Cape Flats. 

The lower eastern slopes of Constantiaberg are covered by the commercial pine and gum plantations of Tokai forest, and are crisscrossed with hiking trails and gravel roads that are used for harvesting the trees. The forest is popular for walking, running and mountain biking.  

The western slopes of the mountain overlook the magnificent scenery of Hout Bay.

The mast is about 100 m high and is visible for perhaps 80 kilometers in any direction. It was constructed in the 1960s and is used to transmit signals for many local television and radio channels, and also to support cellular networks. The South African Weather Service has a radar installation at the summit. 

Constantiaberg is home to a variety of bird and plant species. The mountain is covered mainly by fynbos, a botanical biome native to the Western Cape. The specific vegetation type of the mountain is Peninsula Sandstone Fynbos, an endangered vegetation type that is endemic to the city of Cape Town - occurring nowhere else in the world.

Elephant's Eye cave, a popular hiking destination, is the mountain's biggest feature after the mast. This is visible near the southern end of the mountain when viewed from the Cape Flats. Elephant's Eye is so named because the eastern profile of the mountain resembles an elephant (the range that continues toward Cape Point being the trunk).

External links

Geography of Cape Town
Mountains of the Western Cape
Table Mountain National Park